The Golden Raspberry Award for Worst Supporting Actress is an award presented annually at the Golden Raspberry Awards (or "Razzies") to the worst supporting actress of the previous year. Nominees and winners are voted on by the Golden Raspberry Foundation, a group that anyone can join if they pay a yearly subscription fee.

As it is intended to be a humorous award, males performing in drag are eligible to be nominated. On occasion, people featured in documentary films have also been nominated for "worst actress," though this process has been criticized.

The following is a list of nominees and recipients of that award, along with the film(s) for which they were nominated and the character they played.

Winners and nominees

1980s

1990s

2000s

2010s

2020s

Multiple wins
2 wins
Paris Hilton (House of Wax, Repo! The Genetic Opera)
Madonna (Four Rooms, Die Another Day)

Multiple nominations

5 nominations
Carmen Electra

4 nominations
Kelly Preston

3 nominations
Faye Dunaway
Daryl Hannah
Madonna
Jenny McCarthy
Sean Young

 
2 nominations
Rutanya Alda
Jessica Biel
Colleen Camp
Sofia Coppola
Bo Derek
Goldie Hawn
Salma Hayek
Mariel Hemingway
Marilu Henner
Paris Hilton
Katie Holmes
Amy Irving
Kim Kardashian
Jennifer Lopez
Nicola Peltz
Zelda Rubinstein
Susan Sarandon
Diana Scarwid
Kristen Wiig

Notes

References

External links

 Official Razzie website

Golden Raspberry Awards by category
Film awards for supporting actress